The 2009 South American Under-17 Football Championship was a football competition for U-17 national teams affiliated with CONMEBOL. It was the 13th time the tournament was held. The tournament took place in Chile from April 17 to May 9.

Teams

Squads

First Group Stage
The teams were divided into two groups of five, with the top three teams in each group classifying to the second round.

All times local (UTC-4)

Group A

Group B

Final Group Stage

Final
Argentina and Brazil (directly qualified to the World Championship after finishing 1st in their respective groups) played a match to define a champion.

Goal scorers

7 goals
 Edwin Cardona
4 goals
 Gonzalo Barreto
3 goals
 Daniel Villalba
 Sergio Araujo
 Gilbert Álvarez
 Philippe Coutinho
2 goals
 Esteban Espíndola
 Leandro González Pírez
 Leonel Justiniano
 Wellington
 Zezinho
 Álex González

2 goals (cont.)
 Jonathan de la Cruz
 Renato Zapata
 Adrián Luna
 Sebastián Gallegos
1 goal
 Alejandro Méndez
 Carlos Castro
 Carlos Mendoza
 Samuel Galindo
 Carlão
 Dodô
 Felipinho
 Gerson
 Romário
 Enzo Andia
 Santiago Dittborn

1 goal (cont.)
 Carlos Robles
 Faider Burbano
 Jorge Ramos
 Juan Saiz
 Esteban Villaprado
 Kevin Tello
 Luis Celi
 Richard Caicedo
 Fernando Acuña
 Jorge Salinas
 Julio Domínguez
 Deyair Reyes
 Johan Rey
 José Laureiro
 Luis de los Santos
 Ramón Arias
 Rafaelle Centofani

Countries to participate in 2009 FIFA U-17 World Cup
Top 4 teams qualify for 2009 FIFA U-17 World Cup:

See also
2009 FIFA U-17 World Cup
2009 FIFA U-20 World Cup
2009 South American Youth Championship

References

2009
2009
Under
Under
2009 in youth association football